The Sri Lanka Military Academy (SLMA or SLMA Diyatalawa), commonly known simply as Diyatalawa, is the Sri Lanka Army's training centre where officer cadets are trained for getting commission. It is located in the garrison town of Diyatalawa in the central highlands of Sri Lanka. All Sri Lanka Army officer cadets, including army cadets of the General Sir John Kotelawala Defence University, are trained at SLMA. Although not a university, SLMA is affiliated to the General Sir John Kotelawala Defence University to provide its cadets of regular long course a degree in military studies.

It has capacity to train more than 300 cadets.

History
When the Ceylon Army was raised in 1949, the need arose to recruit and train officers and soldiers of the newly formed army. The Army Recruit Training Depot (ARTD) was therefore formed in Diyatalawa on 6 February 1950 for the purpose of training recruits. The first batch of 114 recruits passed out from the ARTD on 2 June 1950. The ARTD was later named as the Army Training Centre (ATC). But facilities did not exist to train officers, and therefore Officer Cadets were sent to the Royal Military Academy Sandhurst in the United Kingdom. The first batch of ten Officer Cadets were enlisted to the Army on the 10 of October 1949 and were dispatched to RMA Sandhurst.

Subsequently, Officer Cadets were trained at the Indian Military Academy, the National Defence Academy (India), and also to the Pakistan Military Academy in the 1960s.  Due to the cost of training officers overseas, the Ceylon Army initiated officer training at the Army Training Centre in 1968 with the formation of the Officer Cadet School. The first intake of Officer Cadets who were earmarked to be trained at the Army Training Centre, Diyatalawa, were enlisted on 16 April 1968. Since then Officer Cadets were locally trained and commissioned. With the expansion and the growing need to train large numbers of recruits, recruit training was assigned to the respective regiments. In 1988 due to the expansion of the Army and the need for more young officers the ATC was given the responsibility of training only Officer Cadets. With this, the Army Training Centre was re-designated as the Sri Lanka Military Academy with effect from 15 January 1981, and since then it has been totally utilized for training of Officer Cadets. At any one time, five to six hundred Officer Cadets are trained at this institution. In 1999, cadet training have elevated to the standards of bachelor's degree in military studies which will be awarded by the Sabaragamuwa University of Sri Lanka, which was shifted to the General Sir John Kotelawala Defence University in 2011.

SLMA started academic programs for mid-career Officers in basic command and staff techniques at the level of Grade III/II appointments, (Officers in the ranks of Lieutenant / Captain / Major), with the establishment the Officers Study Centre (OSC) in 1981 which conducted the Junior Command Course (JCC) and the Junior Staff Course (JSC). In 2012, these programs of the OSC were transferred to the newly established Officer Career Development Centre.

Organisation
In overall command of the SLMA is the Commandant of the Academy, usually an officer of Major General Rank.

SLMA has several Commissioning Courses each year. Each new intake numbers approximately 150 cadets, each of whom joins a company. The commissioning course is split up into three terms, each lasting fourteen weeks, and on each course, cadets are put into one of four companies. There can be as many as several companies within the SLMA at any one time, each commanded by a Major and named after a famous battle in Sri Lankan history.

The SLMA orgernization is as follows:

 SLMA HQ
 Officer cadet wing
Vijithapura Company (named after the Battle of Vijithapura)
Gannoruwa Company (named after the Battle of Gannoruwa)
Randeniwela Company (named after the Battle of Randeniwela)
Balana Company (named after the Battle of Balana)
 Military training wing
 Academic wing
 Admin wing

Cadet ranks 

 Battalion Under Officer
 Company Under Officer
 Platoon Under Officer
 Battalion Sergeant Major
 Battalion Quarter Master Sergeant
 Company Sergeant Major
 Company Quarter Master Sergeant
 Sergeant
 Corporal
 Lance Corporal
 Cadet

Colours
The President's and ATC colours presented to the ATC in 1972, were laid to rest with the change of name to Sri Lanka Military Academy. The Colours were renamed as SLMA Colours and presented by Her Excellency Chandrika Bandaranaike Kumaratunga, the President of the Democratic Socialist Republic of Sri Lanka, on 21 June 1997, at Diyatalawa.

Traditions
Upon completion of their training, the SLMA hosts the Commissioning ceremony attended by the Commander of the Army, senior army officers, defence attaches of diplomatic establishments and parents. It starts off with the Passing-Out Parade made up of the graduating intakes of cadets, during which the cadets receive the President's Commission along with the Sword of Honour and Trophies, awarded to the cadets first in order of merit. This is followed by the Pipping ceremony where parents of new Officers and Lady Officers adorned their uniform and epaulets with the respective insignia. The event is finished with the Commissioning Dinner.

Training
The Sri Lanka Military Academy, Diyatalawa trains Officer Cadets for both Regular and Volunteer Forces of the Sri Lanka Army. It also has undertaken to train Officer Cadets from the Maldives and Bangladesh since 1992.

Intakes
There are several intakes for cadet officers annually. These are under the following category;
Regular Long Course (Cadet Entry Degree Program) -Two years and nine months - Accredited to the General Sir John Kotelawala Defence University for the Bachelor of Science in Military studies 

Short Service Cadets Course - One year
Volunteer cadets intakes - One year (Probationary officers for the Sri Lanka Army Volunteer Force)
Officer cadets from General Sir John Kotelawala Defence University (final year)
Direct Enlisted Course - Three months (Direct Entry Stream to the Regular Force for professionals such as Doctors, IT specialists, Civil Engineers, Accountants etc.)

The Commissioning Course lasts two and a half years, during this period, cadets are trained in leadership, tactics, weapons training, military law, military accounting systems and academic studies such as General Science, Management, and General Studies. An intensive course in the English language is conducted during the first six months of training to enhance the English knowledge of Officer Cadets. Completion of research work is a partial fulfillment for the Degree other than the Military and Academic Components. Intakes have been named from 1 and today up to Intake 69 are being trained.

Commandants 
Commandants of the ATC
The following officers served as commandants of the Army Training Center:
''This list is incomplete; you can help by expanding it.
Lieutenant Colonel Denis Perera (1969-1972)
Colonel Jayantha de S. Jayaratne (1981-1983)
Colonel C.H. Fernando (1985-1986)
Colonel Devinda Kalupahana (1989-1991)

Commandants of the SLMA
The following officers served as commandants of the college:
''This list is incomplete; you can help by expanding it.
Colonel S.M.Asoka Jayawardena First Commandant 15 Jan 1981 -15 Dec 1981.
Brigadier Niranjan Ranasinghe  ( 2000-2002 )
Brigadier Jagath Jayasuriya (2002-2004)
Brigadier Percy Fernando (1998-2000)
Brigadier Mendaka Samarasinghe (2004-2006)
Brigadier Janaka Walgama (2006-2008)
Brigadier Kumudu Perera (2008-2009)
Brigadier Ruwan Kulatunga (2009-2012) 
Brigadier Indunil Ranasinghe (2012-2014)
Major General Dushyantha Rajaguru (2014-2016); the first general to command the institution 
Brigadier HHASPK Senarathna (2017-2019)
Brigadier S K Eshwaran (2019-2020)
Major General AKGKU Gnanaratne (2020-2021)

Alumni

Parama Weera Vibhushanaya recipients
The following are SLMA graduates who received the Parama Weera Vibhushanaya, the highest decoration for valor;

Captain Saliya Upul Aladeniya  - Sri Lanka Sinha Regiment
Colonel A.F. Lafir  - Special Forces Regiment
Major G. S. Jayanath  - Commando Regiment
Major K. A. Gamage  - 1st Special Forces Regiment
Second Lieutenant K. W. T. Nissanka  - Gajaba Regiment
Lieutenant U. G. A. S. Samaranayake  - 9th Gemunu Watch
Captain H. G. M. H. I. Megawarna  - 9th Gemunu Watch
Captain G. N. Punsiri  - Gajaba Regiment
Lieutenant W. T. Jayatillake  - Gemunu Watch
Major W.M.I.S.B Walisundara

Fox Hill Super Cross
Fox Hill Super Cross is a cross country championship held annually at the Diyatalawa Super cross circuit at Fox Hill which is organized by Sri Lanka Military Academy. It is one of the premier motor racing events in the country.

See also
General Sir John Kotelawala Defence University 
Naval and Maritime Academy
Air Force Academy, China Bay
Sri Lanka Army

References

External links
Sri Lanka Military Academy 
Sri Lanka Army 
Best among the bravest ,SundayTimes

Training establishments of the Sri Lanka Army
Sri Lanka Military Academy
Military education and training in Sri Lanka
Educational institutions established in 1992
Sri Lankan Army bases
Buildings and structures in Uva Province
Diyatalawa
Education in Uva Province
1992 establishments in Sri Lanka